Doris Okada Matsui (born Doris Kazue Okada; September 25, 1944) is an American politician from the Democratic Party, serving since 2005 in the House of Representatives. She represents  (from 2005 to 2013 numbered the 5th district and 2013 to 2023 numbered ), covering the city of Sacramento and its suburbs. Following the death of her husband Bob Matsui on January 1, 2005, she was elected as his replacement and took the oath of office on March 10, 2005.

Early life and career
Matsui was born Doris Okada in the Poston War Relocation Center internment camp in Poston, Arizona, and grew up in Dinuba, in California's Central Valley. While attending the University of California, Berkeley, where she earned a B.A. in psychology, she met her husband. They had one child, Brian.

Matsui was a housewife and socialite and was active in the group "Lawyers' Wives", now called the Legal Auxiliary of Sacramento, while her husband was a local attorney and served on the Sacramento City Council before his election to Congress in 1979. The Matsuis moved to Washington, D.C., shortly thereafter, where they raised their son.

Doris Matsui was a volunteer on Bill Clinton's 1992 presidential campaign. When he was elected, Matsui served on his transition team. After his inauguration, she was appointed deputy special assistant to the president and deputy director of public liaison, working under Alexis Herman. One of her duties was to work with the Asian American community.  She served in the White House from 1993 to 1998. Clinton appointed her to the board of the Woodrow Wilson International Center for Scholars in September 2000. Later, she became a lobbyist in Washington, representing corporate clients until 2005, when she returned to California to run for Congress against a field of local Democrats.

U.S. House of Representatives

Tenure

On January 9, 2005, the day after his funeral, Matsui told supporters she was running for his open seat. In the special election on March 8, 2005, she garnered 68% of the vote. Press reports said that Matsui won the election before the polls opened, as most votes in the election were absentee ballots, which she won overwhelmingly. Matsui was elected to a full term in 2006 and has been reelected six more times without serious difficulty. The 6th is the most Democratic district in interior California; it and its predecessors have been in Democratic hands without interruption since 1953.

As of October 2021, Matsui had voted in line with Joe Biden's stated position 100% of the time.

Women's rights
Matsui is pro-choice and received an endorsement from NARAL. She supports federal health funding that includes abortion funding. She has a focus on preventing unwanted pregnancies altogether by funding contraception programs and making them readily available. She supports emergency contraceptive capabilities in hospitals for rape victims. Matsui opposes restricting minors from traveling across state borders for abortion procedures. She has voted to continue stem cell research. Matsui opposed the overturning of Roe v. Wade. She called the decision "devastating" and said she was "deeply heartbroken and angered" by it.

On March 8, 2021, on the second anniversary of the U.S. women's national soccer team's pay discrimination lawsuit, Matsui and Rosa DeLauro introduced the Give Our Athletes Level Salaries (GOALS) Act, to ensure the U.S. women's national soccer team was "paid fair and equitable wages compared to the U.S. Men's team". The GOALS Act threatens to cut federal funding for the 2026 World Cup if the U.S. Soccer Federation does not comply.

Budget
Matsui has supported political earmarks, saying, "members of Congress know their districts pretty well and know what they need."

Matsui has supported raising the debt limit by $2.4 trillion for federal spending and has supported numerous bailouts and federal funds injections. In 2008 she supported a $15 billion bailout for GM and another $60 billion stimulus package. She supported the initial Troubled Asset Relief Program (TARP) bailout funds and the $825 billion continuation of 2009 in the hopes of avoiding recession. She later supported an additional $198 billion stimulus package. She supports expanding agencies to meet the needs of citizens, rather than cutting spending and reform.

Matsui voted to raise senators' salaries in 2009. She also voted to raise the minimum wage in 2007 and extend unemployment benefits from 39 to 59 weeks.

Drugs
Matsui voted to increase funding to Mexico to fight against the drug cartels. Her rating by NORML indicates that she is "hard on drugs". Matsui supports the distribution of clean and sterile syringes to reduce spread of HIV and hepatitis.

Energy and the environment
Matsui is a member of the House Committee on Energy and Commerce, where she has been focused on making the Sacramento area a hub for clean technology.

Matsui supports American energy independence and desires that the U.S. run on at least 25% renewable energy by 2025. She opposes the expansion of oil production and has voted against building new refineries, offshore drilling, and subsidies for oil and gas exploration. She voted to provide tax subsidies for investment in renewable, alternative sources of energy.

Matsui supports an initiative to develop green public schools across the nation. She endorses cash for clunkers and voted to provide $2 billion more for the program. She seeks to regulate dog kennels and hold tighter prohibition against animal fighting, and has voted to increase wildlife protection from endangerment. Matsui was a supporter of the Clean Water Act and seeks cleaner beaches, lakes, and other bodies of water. She voted to allow the EPA to regulate greenhouse gases and promotes strict limits to pollution levels for industries. She supports individual states creating stricter emission standards than the EPA.

She has supported the expansion of Amtrak to provide a better public transportation option for the public.

LGBT rights
Matsui supports gay rights and was given a rating of 100% by the HRC. Her definition of marriage does not prohibit same-sex partners. She opposes discrimination in the workplace and in schools based on sexual orientation. She has also voted to enforce laws against antigay crimes. She supported the repeal of don't ask, don't tell and sought the reinstatement of gay soldiers who had been discharged from the military.

Gun control
Matsui seeks to expand gun control and supports stricter regulations on gun purchases and sales. She supports banning large-scale purchases of ammunition and seeks to end the gun show loophole. Matsui supports firearms manufacturers being held responsible for product misuse cases and lawsuits.

Health care
In a discussion about the Patient Protection and Affordable Care Act, Matsui said that as "more Americans get to know and understand the law, and feel its effects in their lives, the less the public will want to see us take steps back to the broken health care system we have experienced for decades in this country." She has opposed many attempts to repeal, reduce, or privatize Medicare or Medicaid. In addition she has sought to expand medical coverage to children and the mentally ill. She voted against patients being denied treatment for non-emergency issues without a Medicare copay.

She seeks to establish databases for childhood cancer and diabetes to better meet the needs of patients and diffuse information for better treatment. She supports regulating tobacco as a drug.

Taxes and pensions
Matsui supports a progressive tax system and seeks to shut down offshore loopholes for business. She voted against continuing capital gains and dividend tax breaks. She supports extending AMT exemptions which benefit higher-income taxpayers in states like California with high state income taxes.

Matsui favors continuing Social Security as it is now, and has opposed moves to privatize it or allow citizens the option to have alternative retirement funds. She also opposes raising the retirement age.

Committee assignments
Committee on Energy and Commerce
Subcommittee on Communications and Technology
Subcommittee on Environment
Subcommittee on Health 
Subcommittee on Digital Commerce & Consumer Protection

Caucuses and other memberships
Congressional Asian Pacific American Caucus
National Service Caucus (co-chair)
Smithsonian Institution's Board of Regents
Smithsonian Regents' Governance Committee
Congressional Caucus on Women's Issues (co-chair)
Congressional High-Tech Caucus
Congressional Arts Caucus
Congressional NextGen 9-1-1 Caucus
Afterschool Caucuses

Electoral history

https://elections.cdn.sos.ca.gov/sov/2016-general/sov/26-us-reps-formatted.pdf
https://elections.cdn.sos.ca.gov/sov/2016-general/sov/26-us-reps-formatted.pdf

https://elections.cdn.sos.ca.gov/sov/2018-general/sov/07-summary.pdf
https://elections.cdn.sos.ca.gov/sov/2018-general/sov/07-summary.pdf

2022

Matsui won the June 7 Democratic primary and is running for reelection to the House in the November 8 general election against Republican nominee Max Semenenko.

Personal life
Matsui has one son, Brian. She has two grandchildren. She is a Methodist. On April 11, 2020, Matsui married AES Corporation co-founder Roger Sant in a virtual ceremony.

See also
 List of Asian Americans and Pacific Islands Americans in the United States Congress
 Women in the United States House of Representatives

References

Sources
"Who's Who in President-elect Clinton's transition team". The Washington Post. November 13, 1992. A25.

Footnotes

External links

Congresswoman Doris Matsui official U.S. House website
Doris Matsui for Congress campaign website 
 
 

|-

|-

|-

1944 births
21st-century American politicians
21st-century American women politicians
Methodists from California
American Methodists
American politicians of Japanese descent
American women of Japanese descent in politics
California politicians of Japanese descent
Female members of the United States House of Representatives
Japanese-American internees
Living people
Members of the Junior League
Members of the United States Congress of Japanese descent
Protestants from California
Democratic Party members of the United States House of Representatives from California
Asian-American members of the United States House of Representatives
People from Dinuba, California
Spouses of California politicians
University of California, Berkeley alumni
Women in California politics